Fontoura is a surname. Notable people with the surname include:

Adelino Fontoura (1859–1884), Brazilian poet, actor, and journalist
Ary Fontoura (born 1933), Brazilian actor, writer, director, poet, and television presenter